

NGC 4526 (also listed as NGC 4560) is a lenticular galaxy with an embedded dusty disc, located approximately 55 million light-years from the Solar System in the Virgo constellation and discovered on 13 April 1784 by William Herschel.

The galaxy is seen nearly edge-on. The morphological classification is SAB(s)0°, which indicates a lenticular structure with a weak bar across the center and pure spiral arms without a ring. It belongs to the Virgo cluster and is one of the brightest known lenticular galaxies.
In the galaxy's outer halo, globular cluster orbital velocities indicate abnormal poverty of dark matter: only 43±18% of the mass within 5 effective radii.

The inner nucleus of this galaxy displays a rise in stellar orbital motion that indicates the presence of a central dark mass. This is the first object to have its black-hole mass estimated by measuring the rotation of gas molecules around its centre with an astronomical interferometer (in this case the Combined Array for Research in Millimeter-wave Astronomy).

Supernova SN 1969E was discovered in this galaxy in 1969, reaching a peak magnitude of 16. In 1994, a Type 1a supernova was discovered about two weeks before reaching peak brightness. Designated SN 1994D, it was caused by the explosion of a white dwarf star composed of carbon and oxygen.

See also
 Black Eye Galaxy
 List of NGC objects (1–1000)

References

External links

 
 Lost Galaxy (NGC4526) in Virgo
 SEDS

Lenticular galaxies
Virgo Cluster
Virgo (constellation)
4526
07718
41772
Discoveries by William Herschel